Enterobacter taylorae is a Gram-negative bacteria formerly known as Enteric Group 19, and also known as Enterobacter cancerogenus. Strains of E. taylorae are positive for: Voges-Proskauer, citrate utilization, arginine dihydrolase and malonate utilization. They ferment D-glucose and also ferment D-mannitol, L-rhamnose and cellobiose. They are negative for indole production, urea hydrolysis, lysine decarboxylase and fermentation of adonitol, D-sorbitol and raffinose. It occurs in human clinical specimens, being isolated from blood and from spinal fluid. It is known to cause infections and is not susceptible to penicillins nor cephalosporins.

References

Enterobacteriaceae
Bacteria described in 1985